Orbit: Earth's Extraordinary Journey is a BBC documentary series presented by Kate Humble and Helen Czerski which aired in 2012. Running for three 60 minute episodes, the series focuses on Earth's orbit around the Sun and its effect on humans, the climate, and geological features.

Both presenters visited various locations on Earth including the Cave of Swimmers in Egypt and the Arizona desert.

Episodes

Merchandise
A single-disc DVD of the series was released on 26 March 2012.

Critical reaction
The show received a good review from Stuart Jeffries in The Guardian. However he noted the scheduling of the show being after the watershed, and questioned the need for the presenters to travel around the world for various segments.

References

External links

2012 British television series debuts
2012 British television series endings
BBC high definition shows
BBC television documentaries
English-language television shows